IPN may refer to:

Payments
 Instant payment notification

Chemistry
 Interpenetrating polymer network, form of chemical copolymer
 Isopropyl nitrate, a liquid monopropellant

Industry
 IPN, a type of I-beam used on European standards

Outer space
 Interplanetary Internet
 InterPlaNet
 InterPlanetary Network, a group of spacecraft equipped with gamma-ray burst detectors

Medicine and anatomy
 Infectious pancreatic necrosis, disease in fish
 Interpeduncular nucleus, a region of the brain

Other
 Independent Practitioners Network association for practitioners in psychotherapy, counselling, and related fields
 Index of Place Names in Great Britain
 World Bank's Inspection Panel of the World Bank Group
 Instytut Pamięci Narodowej (Institute of National Remembrance), a Polish historical research institute
 Instituto Pedro Nunes, technology transfer center of the University of Coimbra
 Instituto Politécnico Nacional (National Polytechnic Institute), Mexican university
 International Policy Network (1971–2011), former British think tank
 International Polio Network, former name of Post-Polio Health International
 IPN, IATA code for Usiminas Airport in Minas Gerais, Brazil
 International pitch notation, a method to specify musical pitch